The 2017–18 Butler Bulldogs men's basketball team represented Butler University in the 2017–18 NCAA Division I men's basketball season. They were coached by LaVall Jordan, in his first year as head coach of his alma mater. The Bulldogs played their home games at Hinkle Fieldhouse in Indianapolis, Indiana as members of the Big East Conference. They finished the season 21–14, 9–9 in Big East play to finish a tie for sixth place. As the No. 6 seed in the Big East tournament, they defeated Seton Hall before losing to Villanova in the semifinals. They received an at-large bid to the NCAA tournament as the No. 10 seed in the Midwest region. There they defeated Arkansas in the first round before losing to Purdue in the second round.

Previous season 
The Bulldogs finished the 2016–17 season 25–9, 12–6 in Big East play to finish in second place. They lost to Xavier in the quarterfinals of the Big East tournament. The team received an at-large bid to the NCAA tournament as a No. 4 seed in the South Region. They defeated No. 13 Winthrop and No. 12 Middle Tennessee to advance to the Sweet 16. In the Sweet 16, they lost to eventual National Champion North Carolina.

On June 9, 2017, head coach Chris Holtmann left the school to become the head coach at Ohio State. On June 12, the school hired Milwaukee head coach and Butler alum LaVall Jordan as head coach.

Off season

Departures

2017 recruiting class
Butler originally signed five recruits in its 2017 class which was hailed as the best recruiting class in Butler history. Following Chris Holtmann's departure, however, top-rated recruited Kyle Young was released from his letter of intent and followed Holtmann to Ohio State. On October 8, 2017, Cooper Neese announced he would be transferring to Indiana State before the season began.

Preseason 
In a poll of Big East coaches at the conference's media day, the Bulldogs were picked to finish in eight place in the Big East. Senior forward Kelan Martin was named to the preseason All-Big East First Team.

Roster

Schedule and results
 
|-
!colspan=12 style=| Spain Exhibition Trip

|-
!colspan=12 style=| Exhibition

|-
!colspan=12 style=| Non-conference regular season

|-
!colspan=9 style=|Big East regular season
|-

|-
!colspan=9 style="|Big East tournament

|-
!colspan=12 style=| NCAA tournament

Rankings

*AP does not release post-NCAA tournament rankings

Awards

References

Butler
Butler Bulldogs men's basketball seasons
Butler
Butler
Butler